Dorin Alupei (born 24 February 1973) is a Romanian former rower. He competed at the 1996 Summer Olympics and the 2000 Summer Olympics. He is two-time world champion, winning in 1993 and 1996.

References

External links
 

1973 births
Living people
Romanian male rowers
Olympic rowers of Romania
Rowers at the 1996 Summer Olympics
Rowers at the 2000 Summer Olympics
People from Botoșani County
World Rowing Championships medalists for Romania